The Socialist People's Party (Serbian: Социјалистичка народна странка) is a political party in Serbia founded by Branislav Ivković, a former member of the Socialist Party of Serbia. Ivković was a candidate in the first round of elections for President of Serbia in 2002, winning 1.2% of the vote. In the 2003 re-run of the previous elections, their candidate was Dragan Tomic, who won 2.2% of the vote. In the final re-run of the elections in 2004, Ivković was again the party's candidate, winning 0.4% of the vote. On the 2006 parliamentary election the party ran on the coalition of the Party of United Pensioners of Serbia and the Social Democratic Party that failed to pass the minimum vote percentage requirement.

References 

Socialist parties in Serbia